Senator Gaither may refer to:

Burgess Sidney Gaither (1807–1892), North Carolina State Senate
David Gaither (born 1957), Minnesota State Senate
William Lingan Gaither (died 1858), Maryland State Senate